Jacques-Antoine Granjon born in Marseille (France) on 9 August 1962 in Marseille, is a French entrepreneur and CEO of Veepee.

Biography

Education 
Jacques-Antoine Granjon graduated from the European Business School (EBS) and also studied at the lycée Saint-Louis-de-Gonzague in Paris.

Career
With his friend Julien Sorbac from EBS, he founded the company Cofotex which specialized in the wholesale of overstocked goods. In 1996 he bought the old printing houses of major French newspaper Le Monde in Plaine-Saint-Denis to house the headquarters of the company, which later became part of vente-privee.com. He invented the principal of the flash sale: a sale that lasts only a few days or a few hours.

It was in 2000, inspired by new technologies and his experience in clearance, that Jacques-Antoine created a visual concept to transform the method of selling end of season pieces. In January 2001, with his seven associates, he launched vente-privee.com in France. Since then, the company has grown to more than 2,100 employees with revenues amounting to 1.6 billion euros in 2013.

In 2011, he launched the École européenne des métiers de l'Internet (EEMI) with Xavier Niel, Marc Simoncini and Alain Malvoisin.

Fortune
In 2020, his fortune is estimated at 1.9 billion dollars (1.6 billion euros according to the magazine Challenges).

Prizes and awards
In 2007 he won the “Favor’i d’Honneur” from the “Nuit des Favor’I” organized by Fevad for its 50th anniversary. This prize, determined by those invited to the ceremony by a vote through SMS, recognized the most outstanding personality of the world of distance selling.

In 2008 Jacques-Antoin was elected the “Entrepreneur of the Year” by the judges of the BFM awards    before winning the European prize of “CMO of the Year” (marketing man of the year) in 2009, which was organized by Booz & Company.

In the month of January 2011 he was elected businessman of the year 2010 by GQ. 
 
Jacques-Antoine was chosen as “Personality of the Year” at the 2011 LSA Innovation Awards. 
During 2011, he received the title of “Personality of Communication of the Year 2011” from the Grand Prize agencies of the year.

Personal life
Jacques-Antoine is characterized by his laid back style and outspoken nature. “Better to have hair that is long and clean than short and dirty.” 

He has three children from his first marriage and is currently remarried.

References

External links

1962 births
Living people
French chief executives
French billionaires
Businesspeople from Marseille
European Business School Paris alumni